Norris Turney (September 8, 1921, Wilmington, Ohio, United States – January 17, 2001, Kettering, Ohio) was an American jazz flautist and saxophonist.

Biography
Turney began his career in the Midwest, playing in territory bands such as the Jeter-Pillars Orchestra. He played with Tiny Bradshaw in Chicago before moving to New York City, where he performed with the Billy Eckstine Orchestra in 1945-1946. Turney had little luck in New York, however, and returned to Ohio to play in local ensembles through the 1950s. He toured with Ray Charles in 1967 traveling to the Far East and Australia, then was hired by Duke Ellington, in whose orchestra he played from 1969 to 1973. He was hired to play alto saxophone as an "insurance policy" due to the declining health of Johnny Hodges. He was the first flute soloist to ever play in Ellington's orchestra. He also played tenor saxophone in the band. Amongst his own compositions was "Chequered Hat", written in tribute to Hodges.

Following his tenure with Ellington, he played with the Savoy Sultans and the Newport All-Stars, as well as in several pit orchestras. In the 1980s, he toured and recorded as a member of the Oliver Jackson Quintet, with Ali Jackson, Irvin Stokes, and Claude Black.

Turney recorded as a leader between 1975 and 1978, and released the CD, Big, Sweet 'n Blue in 1993. He died of kidney failure in 2001, at the age of 79.

Discography

As leader
 1978: I Let a Song with Booty Wood, Aaron Bell, Sam Woodyard, Raymond Fol
 1993: Big, Sweet 'n Blue with Larry Willis, Walter Booker, and Jimmy Cobb (Mapleshade)

As sideman
With Jodie Christian
Front Line (Delmark, 1996)
With Roy Eldridge
What It's All About (Pablo, 1976)
With Oliver Jackson
 Billy's Bounce (Black & Blue, 1984)
With Red Richards
 In a Mellow Tone (West 54, 1979)
With Randy Weston
 Tanjah (Polydor, 1973)

References
Footnotes

General references
Scott Yanow, [ Norris Turney] at AllMusic

1921 births
2001 deaths
Musicians from Ohio
American jazz flautists
American jazz saxophonists
American male saxophonists
Duke Ellington Orchestra members
Deaths from kidney failure
People from Wilmington, Ohio
20th-century saxophonists
American male jazz musicians
American Jazz Orchestra members
Savoy Sultans members
Mapleshade Records artists
20th-century American male musicians
20th-century flautists